Siah Vazan (also Romanized as Sīāh Vazān; also known as Sāvehzān, Sāwezān, Sevezan, Sīāh Būzān, Sīāvazān, and Sīāvazān) is a village in Chahar Farizeh Rural District, in the Central District of Bandar-e Anzali County, Gilan Province, Iran. At the 2006 census, its population was 210, in 67 families.

References 

Populated places in Bandar-e Anzali County